Mangayarkarasi is a 1949 Indian Tamil-language film directed by Jiten Banerjee. The film was produced by F. Nagoor and S. N. Ahamed, and stars P. U. Chinnappa, P. Kannamba and Anjali Devi. It is a remake of the Telugu film Gollabhama (1947) and Anjali Devi reprised her role.

Plot
A heavenly seductress takes away the crown prince from his kingdom to her heavenly abode. The wife of the prince is helped by an angel and goes to her husband's abode. They spend the night together. She returns to Earth and finds that she has become pregnant. She is accused of being intimate with the court poet by the King and others. She leaves the palace and goes to live with some tribal people. She delivers a child. The King rescues the child and brings him up. The child grows into a young man. Due to a strange situation the young man wants to have a relationship with his mother without knowing who she is. However, the heavenly woman brings back her husband in time and explains everything so that all ends well.

Cast
Cast according to the opening credits of the film

Male Cast
 P. U. Chinnappa  as  Madhurangathan, Kandarupan, Sudhaman
 N. S. Krishnan  as  Parthiban, Jeevamrudham
 T. S. Durairaj  as  Parthiban's Friend
 Kavi Kambadasan  as  Poet Vidyapathi
 Pudukottai Seenu  as  Panchavarnam
 P. A. Kumar  as  Prime Minister
 P. V. Angappa  as  Minister
 Durai Pandian  as  Parthiban's Friend
 Radhakrishnan  as  Young Jeevamrudham
 C. Valli Nayagam  as  Hunter
 Thirupathi  as  Pujari

Female Cast
 P. Kannamba  as  Mangayarkarasi
 Anjali Devi  as  Sasikala
 T. A. Mathuram  as  Mohana
 Saradambal  as  Dasi Vanji
 D. S. Krishnaveni  as  Vasanthavathi
 T. A. Kantham  as  Maya
 Seetha - Rajam  as  Heavenly Virgins
 Padma — Pattammal  as  Heavenly Virgins
 Lalitha — Vathsala  as  Heavenly Virgins
 Navaneetham  as  Heavenly Virgin
Dance
Lalitha-Padmini

Production
The film featured P. U. Chinnappa in triple roles — King, Prince and the grandson. It was the first time in Tamil cinema that an artiste featured in 3 roles. N. S. Krishnan featured in double roles as father and son. Radhakrishnan played the role of N. S. Krishnan's kid and literally caught a crow in one scene. Thereafter he came to be fondly called as Kaka Radhakrishnan, Kaka in Tamil meaning crow.

The knife dance performed by Lalitha and Padmini was a thriller. The film was shot at Newtone Studios, Madras

Soundtrack
Music was composed by G. Ramanathan, Kunnakudi Venkatarama Iyer and C. R. Subbaraman while the lyrics were penned by Kambadasan, Lakshmana Das and Ku. Sa. Krishnamurthi (film credits). Most of the tunes were set in Carnatic music ragas and were rendered by P. U. Chinnappa became popular. The song Kaadhal Kanirasame set in the raga Chittharanjani, was a hit. It was composed using the same metre, melody and tune of the well-known composition Naatha thanumanisum Sankaram... made famous by Madurai Mani Iyer.

Reception
The film fared well at the box office. Film historian Randor Guy wrote in 2008 that the film is "remembered for: Triple role played by Chinnappa, double role by NSK, pleasing music and Kannamba’s performance."

References

External links

1940s musical drama films
1949 films
Films based on Indian folklore
Films scored by C. R. Subbaraman
Films scored by G. Ramanathan
Films scored by Kunnakudi Venkatarama Iyer
Indian black-and-white films
Indian musical drama films